Trindade Atlético Clube, commonly known as Trindade, is a Brazilian football club based in Trindade, Goiás state.

History
The club was founded on June 15, 2005. They won the Campeonato Goiano Third Level in 2005.

Achievements

 Campeonato Goiano Third Level:
 Winners (1): 2005

Stadium
Trindade Atlético Clube play their home games at Estádio Abrão Manoel da Costa. The stadium has a maximum capacity of 3,000 people.

References

Association football clubs established in 2005
Football clubs in Goiás
2005 establishments in Brazil